U.S. Route 23 (US 23) in North Carolina is a north–south United States highway that runs for  from the Georgia state line, near Dillard, to the Tennessee state line, near Flag Pond.

Route description
From the Georgia state line, with US 441, it goes through the communities of Norton and Otto before reaching Franklin, where it bypasses the city to its east.  Continuing north into Jackson County, it reaches the Great Smoky Mountains Expressway in Dillsboro, where it switches partners from US 441 to US 74.  Going east, it bypasses Sylva and Waynesville; in Clyde, it switches partners again from US 74 to US 19 as it goes through downtown Clyde and Canton, parallel to I-40/US 74.

In Asheville, it connects with I-26/I-240 while crossing the French Broad River; it then continues northbound with I-26/US 19/US 70.  US 23 stays in concurrency with I-26 to the Tennessee state line.  Almost the entire route is four-lane, the exception being between Canton and Candler.

US 23 also make up part of Corridor A and Corridor B in the Appalachian Development Highway System (ADHS).  Corridor A connects I-285, in Sandy Springs, Georgia, to I-40, near Clyde, North Carolina, it overlaps  of US 23.  Corridor B connects I-40, in Asheville, North Carolina, with US 23, near Lucasville, Ohio, it overlaps  of US 23.  ADHS provides additional funds, as authorized by the U.S. Congress, which have enabled US 23 to benefit from the successive improvements along its routing in both corridors.  The white-on-blue banner "Appalachian Highway" is used to mark the ADHS corridor.

Dedicated and memorial names
US 23 in North Carolina has three dedicated or memorialized sections of highway.
 Great Smoky Mountains Expressway – official name of US 23, on sections that overlap with US 74 in Haywood and Jackson counties (approved on September 16, 1983).
 Liston B. Ramsey Freeway – official name of US 23, on the section that overlaps with Interstate 26 in Madison.
 Morris L. McGough Freeway – official name of I-26/US 19/US 23 from I-240 to the Buncombe/Madison county line (approved on April 4, 2002).

Scenic byways
US 23 is part of one scenic byway in the state (indicated by a Scenic Byways sign).

I-26 Scenic Byway is an  byway from the Tennessee state line to exit 9 (US 19/US 23A), near Mars Hill.  US 23, in concurrency with I-26, traverses the entire length, known for its unspoiled views of the North Carolina Mountains.

History
Established in 1930, it entered from Georgia and followed a similar route as the route today to Enka.  In Asheville, it went along route Haywood St across the French Broad River to Jefferson Dr to Patton Dr to Broadway then finally Merrimon north and out of the city.  Going through Weaverville, it continued its concurrency with US 19 till Bald Creek, where it went north with US 19W into Tennessee.

By 1932, US 23 was rerouted in Asheville to use Haywood to Clingman to Hilliard to Biltmore which turns into Broadway. By 1937, US 23 was rerouted again, using Clingman to Patton to College to Biltmore.  Between 1939-44, US 23 was rerouted in Waynesville to use US 276 Russ St to Walnut St back to US 23 Bus. The old Main St routing became US 19A-23A.  In 1949, US 23 was moved west onto new bypass (Patton Avenue) around western Asheville, leaving US 23 Alternate (later US 23 Business).  In 1952, US 23 was rerouted north of Mars Hill, replacing NC 36 into Tennessee.  In 1961, US 23 was removed from downtown Asheville and placed on the East-West Expressway, however continuing north on Merrimon Avenue. In 1966, it was placed on new freeway east, bypassing Weaverville; then in 1973, it was removed from Merrimon Avenue onto freeway.

In 1968, US 23 was placed on new freeway bypass west of Waynesville, leaving US 23 Business through town.  In 1974, US 23 bypassed Franklin to the east, its old route is signed today as US 441 Business.  Also in the same year, Sylva was bypassed to the north, leaving US 23 Business following the old route through town.

In 2006, US 23 moved onto I-26, north of Mars Hill, leaving US 23A following the old route through northern Madison County.

Future
US 19/23, from Canton to Candler, is to be widened to a multi-lane highway and its bridge replaced over the Pigeon River.  This project is currently funded.

US 23, in concurrency with Interstate 26 and US 19, is planned to be realigned onto a new interchange at Interstate 240 and freeway improvements north from it.  Right-of-way purchases are to begin in 2023, however the project is unfunded.

Junction list

See also

 Special routes of U.S. Route 23
 North Carolina Bicycle Route 2 - Concurrent with US 23 from Sylva to Balsam

References

External links

 NCRoads.com: US 23

23
Transportation in Macon County, North Carolina
Transportation in Jackson County, North Carolina
Transportation in Haywood County, North Carolina
Transportation in Buncombe County, North Carolina
Transportation in Madison County, North Carolina
 
1930 establishments in North Carolina